The Belgrade Beer Fest is an annual festival of beer in Belgrade, Serbia. Started in 2003, the festival is held annually over five days each August as a showcase event for various beer producers. In addition to domestic and foreign brews, the festival features live music performances each evening.

It has quickly grown in size and popularity: in 2004, it attracted over 75,000 foreign visitors to Belgrade and in 2005 it was the second most visited festival in Serbia with 300,000 visitors. In 2009 it attracted more than 650,000 visitors, and in 2010 the festival attracted about 900,000 visitors.

The festival entrance is free.

No festival was held in 2020.

History

Accolades
On December 31, 2005 the British newspaper The Independent named Belgrade Beer Fest "one of the worldwide events to visit in 2006".

Incidents
On 19 August 2007, the last day of the 2007 Belgrade Beer Fest at Kalemegdan Fortress, the body of 22-year-old Branko Jovanović from Belgrade was found lifeless and partially consumed in a Belgrade Zoo bear cage (also located at the Fortress). It is believed that the man, possibly under the influence of alcohol or narcotics, may have fallen from a restaurant overlooking the bear cage, an open-air structure with no roof. Two adult bears had dragged the man's body to the feeding corner of the cage. The investigation department of the court claimed that there were no indications that the young man was murdered. Subsequently, the following year's 2008 edition of the festival was relocated from the Fortress.

On 20 August 2011, an attacker randomly stabbed eight visitors of the festival with a knife. Later identified as Ljubomir Trifunović from Belgrade, the attacker was sentenced to seven years in prison.

See also
 Beer in Serbia

References

External links

 Belgrade Beer Fest - Official website

Annual fairs
Music festivals in Serbia
Beer festivals in Europe
Beer in Serbia
Food and drink festivals in Serbia
Fairs in Serbia
Tourist attractions in Belgrade
Entertainment in Belgrade
Annual events in Serbia
2003 establishments in Serbia
Music in Belgrade
Music festivals established in 2003
Summer events in Serbia
New Belgrade